XXL represented Macedonia in the 2000 Eurovision Song Contest after winning the national final selection for the Eurovision Song Contest 2000 with the song "100% te ljubam".

Before Eurovision

Skopje Fest 2000 
The national final, was held on 19 February 2000 at the Universal Hall in Skopje. Katerina Krstevska and Dragan B. Kostic hosted the event. The voting was in 3 parts - an "expert" jury of 21 people (who each awarded 100 points to their favourite song), the votes of the audience in the Universal Hall (who could give 1 point to their favourite song) and televoting (with the favourite of the televoting getting 200 points, 2nd getting 180 points...). Toše Proeski won the televote with about 38,000 votes and XXL were second with about 30,000 votes.

At Eurovision

Voting

References

2000
Countries in the Eurovision Song Contest 2000
Eurovision